The Gerald Loeb Award is an annual journalism award, established in 1957 and administered by the UCLA Anderson School of Management since 1973.

 List of Audio, Video, and Video/Audio winners
 List of Breaking News winners
 List of Broadcast and Broadcast Enterprise winners
 List of Books, Business Books, and Special Book Award winners
 List of Columns, Commentary, and Editorials winners
 List of Deadline and/or Beat Writing, Deadline or Beat Writing, Deadline Writing, Beat Writing, and Beat Reporting winners
 List of Explanatory winners
 List of Feature winners
 List of Gerald Loeb Memorial Award winners
 List of Images, Graphics, Interactives, and Visuals winners
 List of International winners
 List of Investigative winners
 List of Large Newspapers winners
 List of Lifetime Award winners
 List of Local winners
 List of Magazines winners
 List of Minard Editor Award winners
 List of Newspaper winners
 List of News Service, Online, and Blogging winners
 List of Personal Finance and Personal Service winners
 List of Radio winners
 List of Small and Medium Newspapers winners
 List of Special Award winners
 List of Spot News winners
 List of Television winners

References

American journalism awards
Awards established in 1957